At the 1952 Winter Olympics in Oslo, one ski jumping event was contested.

Medalists

Results

Participating NOCs
Thirteen nations participated in ski jumping at the Oslo Games.

References

 
1952 Winter Olympics events
1952
1952 in ski jumping
Ski jumping competitions in Norway